Behind the Myth is the second album by the Arcado String Trio featuring violinist Mark Feldman, cellist Hank Roberts and bassist Mark Dresser, which was recorded in 1990 and released on the JMT label.

Reception
The AllMusic review by David Jeffries says, "Behind the Myth is filled with intriguing musical surprises and enough substance to make it worthy of repeat listening".

Track listing
 "Ediface" (Mark Dresser) - 7:43   
 "Waterburg Trio" (Hank Roberts) - 10:26   
 "Thematica" (Dresser) - 8:39   
 "Behind the Myth" (Mark Feldman) - 12:54   
 "Kerney" (Feldman) - 8:57   
 "Somewhere" (Roberts) - 5:13

Personnel
Mark Feldman - violin
Hank Roberts - cello
Mark Dresser - bass

References 

1990 albums
Mark Feldman albums
Hank Roberts albums
Mark Dresser albums
JMT Records albums
Winter & Winter Records albums